St Peter's High School and Sixth Form Centre is a Roman Catholic academy school and sixth form centre, on Stroud Road in the Tuffley area of Gloucester, England. The head teacher is Kevin McDermott. The main feeder schools are St. Peter's Catholic Primary School, Our Lady's Churchdown, The Rosary School, Stroud, St Joseph's Primary School, Nympsfield and St Dominic's Catholic Primary School, Stroud.

Notable alumni 

Jack Adams, rugby union player
Bridget Christie, comedian, actress and writer
Adam Eustace, rugby union player
Marcel Garvey, rugby union player
Aaron Hinkley, rugby union player
Ryan Lamb, rugby union player
Mary-Jess Leaverland, singer and winner of a Chinese version of The X Factor
Charlie Sharples, rugby union player

References

External links

Schools in Gloucester
Academies in Gloucestershire
Educational institutions established in 1964
Catholic secondary schools in the Diocese of Clifton
1964 establishments in England
Secondary schools in Gloucestershire